David Halliwell (born 11 December 1948) is a former English cricketer.  Halliwell was a left-handed batsman who bowled right-arm fast-medium.  He was born in Leyland, Lancashire.

Halliwell initially played Minor Counties Championship cricket for Cheshire from 1978 to 1979.  He later joined Cumberland, making his debut for the county in the 1981 Minor Counties Championship against the Lancashire Second XI.  Halliwell played Minor counties cricket for Cumberland from 1981 to 1990, including 59 Minor Counties Championship matches and 7 MCCA Knockout Trophy matches.  In 1984, he made his List A debut against Derbyshire in the NatWest Trophy.  He played five further List A matches for Cumberland, the last of which came against Lancashire in the 1989 NatWest Trophy.  In his five List A matches, he scored 28 runs at a batting average of 14.00, with a high score of 25*.  With the ball he took 9 wickets at a bowling average of 25.44, with best figures of 4/57.  His best figures came against Middlesex in the 1985 NatWest Trophy.

He also played Second XI cricket for the Northamptonshire Second XI.

References

He also used to be batting partners with David Lloyd.

External links
David Halliwell at ESPNcricinfo
David Halliwell at CricketArchive

1948 births
Living people
People from Leyland, Lancashire
Sportspeople from Lancashire
English cricketers
Cheshire cricketers
Cumberland cricketers